Mawiyah District is a district of the Taiz Governorate, Yemen. In 2003, the district had a population of 129,765.

References

Districts of Taiz Governorate